Innan Glyvur is a village on the Faroese island of Eysturoy in the Sjóvar Municipality. It is on the west side of Skálafjørður. It was founded in 1884.

See also
 List of towns in the Faroe Islands

External links

Faroeislands.dk: Innanglyvur Images and description of all cities on the Faroe Islands.

Populated places in the Faroe Islands
Populated places established in 1884
1884 establishments in the Faroe Islands